Admiral Pelham Aldrich  (8 December 1844 – 12 November 1930) was a Royal Navy officer and explorer, who became Admiral Superintendent of Portsmouth Docks.

Biography
He was born in Mildenhall, Suffolk, the son of Dr. Pelham Aldrich and Elizabeth Frances Aldrich, and married Edith Caroline Issacson in 1875. He entered the Royal Navy as a Naval Cadet in June 1859 and was promoted to sub-lieutenant on 17 September 1864 and lieutenant on 11 September 1866.

Whilst on board the Challenger, he took part in the four-year-long Challenger expedition of 1872–76 – a scientific expedition that made many discoveries to lay the foundation of oceanography. In 1875, he transferred to the sloop  to take part in the British Arctic Expedition, which was sent by the British Admiralty to attempt to reach the North Pole via Smith Sound. Aldrich commanded the Western Sledge Party to Ellesmere Island, and what is often described as the most northerly point of North America is named Cape Aldrich in his honour. As captain of Fawn he, along with the scientist Stephen Joseph Perry, observed the 1882 transit of Venus from an improvised tent observatory in Madagascar.

In 1888 Egeria visited Christmas Island.  On board was Charles Wyville Thomson (who had been chief scientist on the Challenger Expedition) who named a crinoid Bathycrinus aldrichianus after Aldrich. In 1978 a Christmas Island stamp was issued in his honour.

Mount Aldrich, in Antarctica, was named after him by Robert Scott to thank him for his assistance given in preparing for Scott's expedition.

Aldrich was promoted to rear-admiral on 21 December 1898, and served as admiral superintendent of Portsmouth Dockyard between 1 September 1899 and 1 September 1902, flagship HMS Asia. He was appointed a Commander of the Royal Victorian Order (CVO) by King Edward VII in 1902. The following year, he was promoted to vice-admiral on 12 August 1903 and finally admiral on 1 March 1907.

He retired from the Navy on 22 March 1908 and moved to The Croft, in Great Bealings in Suffolk. He died in Great Bealings and was buried in the local churchyard on 17 November 1930. His wife was buried in the same place on 6 May 1943, aged 94.

References

English explorers
Commanders of the Royal Victorian Order
1844 births
1930 deaths
Royal Navy admirals
Explorers of the Arctic
People from Mildenhall, Suffolk
19th-century Royal Navy personnel